Youssoufou Niakaté (born 16 December 1992) is a French footballer who plays as a forward for Saudi Arabian club Al-Ettifaq.

On 27 September 2018 he scored a hattrick against RSC Anderlecht in the Belgian Cup. Union SG won the game 0–3.

Personal life
Born in France, Niakaté is of Malian descent.

References

Living people
1992 births
Association football forwards
French footballers
Malian footballers
French sportspeople of Malian descent
Ligue 2 players
Saudi Professional League players
FCM Aubervilliers players
US Avranches players
US Créteil-Lusitanos players
US Boulogne players
Royale Union Saint-Gilloise players
Al-Wehda Club (Mecca) players
Ittihad FC players
Ettifaq FC players
Expatriate footballers in Saudi Arabia
Malian expatriate sportspeople in Saudi Arabia
French expatriate sportspeople in Saudi Arabia
Expatriate footballers in Belgium
Malian expatriate sportspeople in Belgium
French expatriate sportspeople in Belgium